Alain Chatillon (born 15 March 1943) is a member of the Senate of France.  He represents the Haute-Garonne department and is a member of the Radical Party.

References
Page on the Senate website

1943 births
Living people
People from Haute-Garonne
Politicians from Occitania (administrative region)
The Republicans (France) politicians
Union for a Popular Movement politicians
Union of Democrats and Independents politicians
Radical Party (France) politicians
Radical Movement politicians
French Senators of the Fifth Republic
Senators of Haute-Garonne
Mayors of places in Occitania (administrative region)